George Chandler (June 30, 1898 – June 10, 1985) was an American actor who starred in over 140 feature films, usually in smaller supporting roles, and he is perhaps best known for playing the character of Uncle Petrie Martin on the television series Lassie, and as the unfortunate young man who drank The Fatal Glass of Beer in a 1933 short comedy starring W.C. Fields.

Early years
He was born in Waukegan, Illinois, on June 30, 1898. During his infancy, his family moved to Hinsdale, Illinois. Early in his career, he had a vaudeville act, billed as "George Chandler, the Musical Nut," which featured comedy and his violin.  He made his debut in film in 1929.

Career 

George Chandler had a plain, unassuming face, allowing him to play incidental and background roles in dozens of movies. His outstanding facial feature was a wide, toothy smile. Today's audiences may know him from the Mack Sennett comedy The Fatal Glass of Beer (1933) starring W. C. Fields. In this absurd satire of antique Yukon melodramas, Chandler plays Fields's son Chester, the wayward youth who dared to drink beer in a saloon, causing his downfall. George Chandler played character roles exclusively, often in comedies: bartenders, shopkeepers, cab drivers, reporters, photographers, desk clerks, messengers, farmers, passersby, spectators -- many times with only a few lines of dialogue. In Footlight Parade (1933), Chandler plays the druggist who sells Chester Kent (James Cagney) aspirin, and explains how the low price comes from the drugstore chain buying in large quantities, which starts off the premise of the movie. In Olsen and Johnson's Hellzapoppin', Chandler plays the cameraman on their film set, and reacts to the chaos with only four words of dialogue. He has a larger role than usual in the Charlie Chan mystery The Shanghai Cobra (1945); Chandler runs an all-night coffee shop that becomes the scene of a murder.

Television
Like many established movie character players, Chandler kept busy in the new field of television. 
Chandler appeared six times in The Adventures of Kit Carson (1951–1955) in episodes titled "Law of Boot Hill", "Lost Treasure of the Panamints", "Trails Westward", "The Wrong Man", "Trail to Bordertown", and "Gunsmoke Justice". He guest starred on The Public Defender. He appeared as the character Ames in the two-part episode "King of the Dakotas" in Frontier. In 1954–1955, he was cast in two episodes of the sitcom It's a Great Life. He appeared in the 1956 episode "Joey and the Stranger" of Fury. He was cast as Clay Hunnicutt in the 1957 episode "The Giveaway" of the sitcom The People's Choice.

In 1958, Chandler appeared as Cleveland McMasters in the episode "The Cassie Tanner Story" on Wagon Train. Also in 1958 he appeared in Wagon Train′s episode "The Sacramento Story."

In the 1960–1961 television season, Chandler guest-starred on an episode of the one-season sitcom Bringing Up Buddy. In the 1961–1962 television season. In 1967, he appeared in an episode of the western TV series Bonanza as Gus Schultz ("The Greedy Ones"). In 1970 Chandler appeared as Hawkins in the TV western The Men From Shiloh, in the episode titled "With Love, Bullets and Valentines."

Starring role
In 1956, George Chandler was cast as homespun philosopher Ichabod Adams in an episode of Robert Montgomery Presents entitled "Goodbye, Grey Flannel," and he reprised the role in 1957 in another Montgomery episode titled "One Smart Apple." In 1960, Chandler brought back the Ichabod Adams role in "Adams' Apples," an episode of General Electric Theater. It later became a full-fledged series, Ichabod and Me (1961-62), at last giving Chandler a starring role, a show of his own, and steady exposure. The series co-starred Robert Sterling and Christine White.

Other professional activities
In 1960, Chandler was elected president of the Screen Actors Guild.

Death 
Chandler died in Panorama City, California, of cancer, on June 10, 1985, at the age of 86—20 days before his 87th birthday.

Filmography

References

Further reading

External links
 
 

1898 births
1985 deaths
Male actors from Illinois
American male film actors
American male television actors
Presidents of the Screen Actors Guild
Actors from Waukegan, Illinois
Male actors from Los Angeles
Deaths from cancer in California
20th-century American male actors
American military personnel of World War I
Activists from California
Military personnel from Illinois